Eduardo Varela Pezzano (born 15 June 1984) is a Colombian trademark and entertainment law attorney at the legal firm Cavelier Abogados, where is the head of the trademark and copyright practice of the law firm.

He is the son of former Colombian senator Ricardo Varela Consuegra.

Select publications 
 Propiedad Intelectual: Reflexiones, Universidad del Rosario, 2012, coauthored with Edgar Iván León Robayo & Ricardo Metke.
 Doing Business in Colombia, Juris Publishing, 2011, coauthored with Natalia Tobón Franco.
 Estudios de Propiedad Intelectual, Universidad del Rosario, 2011, coauthored with Edgar Iván León Robayo & Ricardo Metke.
 Derecho del Entretenimiento para Adultos, Grupo Ed. Ibáñez, 2010, coauthored with Natalia Tobón Franco.
 Derecho de Autor para Creativos, Grupo Ed. Ibáñez, 2010, coauthored with Natalia Tobón Franco.

References 

1984 births
Living people
Colombian journalists
Male journalists
21st-century Colombian lawyers
Colombian writers